Fuji An or variant, may refer to:

 Fuji-An Gardens, Shimo-fukushima Park, Fukushima, Osaka, Osaka, Kansai, Honshu, Japan
 Fuji An, an internet celebrity working for Shopee

See also

 Fujian (disambiguation)
 Fu Jian (disambiguation)
 Fuji (disambiguation)
 An (disambiguation)